Heshan Tillakaratne (born 16 December 1976) is a Sri Lankan former cricketer. He played in 75 first-class and 62 List A matches between 1998/99 and 2010/11. He made his Twenty20 debut on 17 August 2004, for Moors Sports Club in the 2004 SLC Twenty20 Tournament.

References

External links
 

1976 births
Living people
Sri Lankan cricketers
Antonians Sports Club cricketers
Badureliya Sports Club cricketers
Lankan Cricket Club cricketers
Matara Sports Club cricketers
Moors Sports Club cricketers
Moratuwa Sports Club cricketers
Sebastianites Cricket and Athletic Club cricketers
Place of birth missing (living people)